Piridi is a Major Panchayat village in Bobbili mandal of Vizianagaram District in Andhra Pradesh, India.

Demographics
 Indian census, the demographic details of this village is as follows:
 Total Population:  5,366 in 1,313 Households.
 Male Population:  2,710
 Female Population:  2,656
 Children Under 6-years of age: 551 (Boys - 268 and Girls - 283)
 Total Literates:  2,363

See also 
VISHWA SHANTI RATHAM, SRI SATHYA SAI MANDIR, SAI BABA TEMPLE PIRIDI, Built by Dr Kolli S.Chalam, MBBS; MD; PDCC, Professor of Rajiv Gandhi University of Health Sciences, Bangalore, Karnataka. He is working as HOD of Critical Care Medicine at Sri Sathya Sai Institute of Higher Medical Sciences, Whitefield, Karnataka.

విశ్వ శాంతి రథం, శ్రీ సత్య సాయి మందిర్, సాయి బాబా టెంపుల్ పిరిడి, డాక్టర్ కొల్లి ఎస్.చలం నిర్మించారు, ఎంబిబిఎస్; ఎండి; పిడిసిసి, కర్ణాటకలోని బెంగుళూరులోని రాజీవ్ గాంధీ యూనివర్శిటీ ఆఫ్ హెల్త్ సైన్సెస్ ప్రొఫెసర్. కర్ణాటకలోని వైట్‌ఫీల్డ్‌లోని శ్రీ సత్య సాయి ఇనిస్టిట్యూట్ ఆఫ్ హయ్యర్ మెడికల్ సైన్సెస్‌లో క్రిటికల్ కేర్ మెడిసిన్ HOD గా పనిచేస్తున్నారు.

References

Villages in Vizianagaram district

http://www.rguhs.ac.in/online_teachers_database_rguhs.html